The American Journal of Chinese Medicine is published by World Scientific and covers topics relating to alternative medicine of all cultures, such as traditional Chinese medicine, including acupuncture. It was established in 1973 by Frederick F. Kao.

Journal contents
The journal only publishes papers following the Declaration of Helsinki and the "Guiding Principles and Procedures of the Massachusetts General Hospital on Human Studies, 1970." In particular emphasis is placed on the following areas:

 Basic scientific and clinical research in indigenous medical techniques, therapeutic procedures, medicinal plants, and traditional medical theories and concepts
 Multidisciplinary study of medical practice and health care, especially from historical, cultural, public health, and socioeconomic perspectives
 International policy implications of comparative studies of medicine in all cultures, including such issues as health in developing countries, affordability and transferability of health-care techniques and concepts
 Translating scholarly ancient texts or modern publications on ethnomedicine

Editors-in-chief
 1973 - 1992: Frederick F. Kao, founding editor-in-chief
 1993 - 2003: John J. Kao
 2003–present: Chun-Su Yuan

Abstracting and indexing
The journal is abstracted and indexed in Biological Abstracts, Current Contents/Clinical Medicine,  Science Citation Index Expanded, and Index Medicus.

References

External links

Impact Factor, BioxBio.com 2008-2010
Lai Chau Ginseng - Golden Medicine From Nature 

Publications established in 1973
English-language journals
World Scientific academic journals
Traditional Chinese medicine
Alternative and traditional medicine journals
Bimonthly journals